Locomotive, Railway Carriage & Wagon Review was a British monthly magazine covering the rail transport industry. It was first published in 1896 as Moore's Monthly Magazine. After 65 years and 807 issues, it ceased in November 1959 being incorporated into sister Ian Allan Publishing publication Trains Illustrated in January 1960 which in turn became Modern Railways in January 1962.

It primarily focused on new railway locomotives and rolling stock with a combination of news and reviews. Although with an emphasis on activities in the United Kingdom, it did cover other countries, notably the Netherlands and British Colonies.

References

Locomotive Magazine/Locomotive [Magazine and] Railway Carriage & Wagon Review Steam Index

Monthly magazines published in the United Kingdom
Hobby magazines published in the United Kingdom
Magazines established in 1896
Magazines disestablished in 1959
Rail transport magazines published in the United Kingdom
1896 establishments in England
1959 disestablishments in England